Irina Atykovna Azizyan (April 9, 1935 - June 22, 2009, in Moscow) was a Russian painter and art critic. Her work is in the collections of the State Museum of Oriental Art, the Shchusev Museum of Architecture, and the Vorontsov Palace Museum.

References 

1935 births
2009 deaths
Russian painters